The XMM Cluster Survey (XCS) is a serendipitous X-ray galaxy cluster survey being conducted using archival data taken by ESA’s XMM-Newton satellite. Galaxy clusters trace the large scale structure of the universe, and their number density evolution with redshift provides a way to measure cosmological parameters, independent of cosmic microwave background experiments or supernovae cosmology projects.

The collaboration is based in the United Kingdom and this is also where the majority of researchers are based. However, there are members of the collaboration across Europe and the Atlantic.

Science Goals 
 Derivation of cosmological parameters
 Measurement of X-ray scaling relations and their evolution
 Galaxy evolution in dense environments
 Properties of unusual (non cluster) X-ray sources, such as high redshift quasars and isolated neutron stars.

Achievements 
The XCS collaboration have detected 503 clusters serendipitously in XMM-Newton observations.

Publications

References

External links 
 XMM Cluster Survey

Astrophysics